New Zealand participated at the 2018 Summer Youth Olympics in Buenos Aires, Argentina from 6 October to 18 October 2018.

Archery

Individual

Team

Athletics

Badminton

New Zealand qualified one player based on the Badminton Junior World Rankings.

Singles

Team

Basketball

New Zealand qualified a boys' team based on the U18 3x3 National Federation Ranking.

 Boys' tournament - 1 team of 4 athletes

Beach volleyball

New Zealand qualified a boys' and girls' team based on their performance at the 2018 Oceania U19 Championship.

 Boys' tournament - 1 team of 2 athletes
 Girls' tournament - 1 team of 2 athletes

Boxing

Boys

Girls

Canoeing

New Zealand qualified three boats based on its performance at the 2018 World Qualification Event.

 Boys' C1 - Finn Anderson
 Boys' K1 - George Snook
 Girls' C1 - Kahlia Cullwick

Cycling

New Zealand qualified a boys' and girls' combined team based on its ranking in the Youth Olympic Games Junior Nation Rankings. The also  qualified a mixed BMX racing team based on its ranking in the Youth Olympic Games BMX Junior Nation Rankings.

 Boys' combined team - 1 team of 2 athletes
 Girls' combined team - 1 team of 2 athletes
 Mixed BMX racing team - 1 team of 2 athletes

Equestrian

New Zealand qualified a rider based on its ranking in the FEI World Jumping Challenge Rankings.

 Individual Jumping - Briar Burnett-Grant

Summary

Golf

Individual

Team

Gymnastics

Artistic
New Zealand qualified one gymnast based on its performance at the 2018 Oceania Junior Championship.

 Boys' artistic individual all-around - 1 quota

Judo

Individual

Team

Karate

 Boys' +68 kg - Raukawa Jefferies

Rugby sevens

New Zealand qualified a girls' team based on its performance at the Oceania Rugby U18s Sevens Championship.

Girls' tournament

Roster

Tiana Davison
Dhys Faleafaga
Tynealle Fitzgerald
Iritana Hohaia
Jazmin Hotham
Ricshay Lemanu
Azalleyah Maaka
Risaleaana Pouri-Lane
Montessa Tairakena
Kalyn Takitimu-Cook
Arorangi Tauranga
Hinemoa Watene

Gold Medal Game

Sailing

New Zealand qualified two boats based on its performance at the Oceania Techno 293+ Youth Olympic Games Qualifier. They also qualified one boat based on its performance at the Asian and Oceania IKA Twin Tip Racing Qualifiers.

 Boys' Techno 293+ - 1 boat
 Girls' Techno 293+ - 1 boat
 Girls' IKA Twin Tip Racing - 1 boat

Sport climbing

New Zealand qualified one sport climber based on its performance at the 2017 Oceania Youth Sport Climbing Championships.

 Girls' combined - 1 quota (Sarah Tetzlaff)

Swimming

Table tennis

New Zealand qualified two table tennis players based on its performance at the Oceania Continental Qualifier.

 Boys' singles - Nathan Xu
 Girls' singles – Hui Ling Vong

Tennis

Singles

Doubles

Triathlon

New Zealand qualified two athletes based on its performance at the 2018 Oceania Youth Olympic Games Qualifier.

Individual

Relay

Weightlifting

Supatchanin Khamhaeng from Thailand was disqualified after testing positive for a banned substance. She was stripped of her gold medal and Kanah Andrews-Nahu got the bronze medal.

Wrestling

New Zealand qualified four wrestlers based on its performance at the 2018 Oceania Cadet Championship.

Key:
  – Victory by Fall
  – Without any points scored by the opponent
  – With point(s) scored by the opponent
  – Without any points scored by the opponent
  – With point(s) scored by the opponent

References

2018 in New Zealand sport
Nations at the 2018 Summer Youth Olympics
New Zealand at the Youth Olympics